Pétur Haraldsson Blöndal (24 June 1944 – 26 June 2015) was an Icelandic parliamentarian in the Icelandic Independence Party and was president in the committees of the Organization for Security and Co-operation in Europe, Social Affairs Committee and Health and Ensurance Committee.

He held a doctorate in mathematics from the University of Cologne. He ran unsuccessfully for the chairmanship of the Independence Party at their national meeting in late June 2010 and received 30% of the vote.

He died in his home on 26 June 2015 after years of battling cancer.

References

External links
Non auto-biography of Pétur Blöndal on the homepage of Alþingi
The homepage of Pétur Blöndal

1944 births
2015 deaths
Members of the Althing
Independence Party (Iceland) politicians